Saša Radulović (born 1965) is former Minister of Economy of Serbia.

Saša Radulović may also refer to:
Saša Radulović (footballer, born 1978), Bosnian-Herzegovinian and Australian footballer
Saša Radulović (footballer, born 1984), Serbian footballer
Sasa Radulovic (architect) (born 1972), Canadian architect
Saša Novak Radulović (born 1964), Croatian guitarist